Tomas Andersson Wij (born 6 February 1972, birthname: Tomas Per Andersson), often abbreviated as TAW, is a Swedish singer, songwriter, and journalist.

Early life
He was born on 6 February 1972 in Stockholm, Sweden and raised in the south suburbs Fruängen and Sköndal.

Journalist and editor
Between years 1990 and 1997, Tomas Andersson Wij was a writer in Svenska Dagbladet, as well as Swedish music magazine Pop and Swedish entertainment publication Nöjesguiden. In the mid 1990s, he was editor of the television show Knesset on ZTV. He also worked as a DJ for Sveriges Radio in the summer of 2000.

He has edited two anthologies, Solidaritet (Cordia 1998) and Boken om Recovery (Libris, 2002). He is cofounder and coeditor alongside Sven-Gösta Holst for the existentialist journal Von Oben, which published two issues in 2002 and 2003.

Music
Producer Lars Halapi discovered Tomas Andersson Wij through a simple demo tape in 1995 and went on to produce Tomas Andersson Wij's first two albums. After the breakthrough album Ett slag för dig he toured regularly, usually as a solo act with his guitar. He was nominated for the Swedish Grammies for four times. TAW was also known as a great literature and poetry writer.

TAW attracted much more attention with in 2000 with his Swedish lyrics of Billy Joel songs, in the Helen Sjöholm album Euforia - Helen Sjöholm sjunger Billy Joel. In 2007 he took part in Melodifestivalen interpreting Carola's winning song Evighet also known as "Invincible" at the final in Globen.

The same year he received the Café Magazine's category for "best dressed artist".

He has also written songs or translated lyrics for other artists and translations into other Swedish artists such as Freddie Wadling, Totta Näslund and Bo Kaspers Orkester.

In 2013, he was awarded the Evert Taube Scholarship.

Discography

Albums
 1998: Ebeneser
 2000: Ett slag för dig
 2002: Vi är värda så mycket mer
 2004: Stjärnorna i oss
 2005: Live på Rival
 2005: Tomas Andersson Wij
 2007: En introduktion till Tomas Andersson Wij
 2008: En sommar på speed
 2010: Spår
 2012: Romantiken
 2014: Mörkrets hastighet
 2018: Avsändare okänd
 2019: Splitter, Vol. 1
 2020: Högre än händerna når
 2022: Åskan i hjärtat

Singles and EPs
 1997: "Varelser i vattnet"
 1998: "Tusen sätt att försvinna"
 1998: "Väljer dig"
 2000: Landet vi föddes i EP
 2000: "Du skulle tagit det helt fel"
 2000: "Gör nånting vackert"
 2000: "Hej då"
 2001: "Ett slag för dig"
 2002: "Jag börjar minnas mig"
 2002: "Slå"
 2002: "Vissa dagar"
 2003: "Blues från Sverige"
 2004: "Tommy och hans mamma"
 2004: "Sången om dig och mig"
 2005: "Oroshjärta"
 2006: En hel värld inom mig (EP)
 2007: "1980"
 2007: "Hälsingland"
 2007: "Evighet"
 2007: "Mellanstora mellansvenska städer"
 2008: "Jag har simmat långt ut från land"
 2008: "Sena tåg"
 2008: "När ditt tåg kommer"
 2009: "Det ligger i luften"
 2010: "Allt är bättre än ingenting"
 2011: "Jag är på väg till dig"
 2012: "Sturm Und Drang"
 2012: "Romantiken" (EP)
 2013: "Här kommer alla känslorna (på en och samma gång)"
 2016: "Vi får dö en annan dag"
 2017: "Jag nådde aldrig riktigt fram till dig"
 2018: "Just idag känns du nära (Saras sång)
 2019: "Stockholmssommar"
 2020: "Jag var ett konstigt barn"
 2020: "Dit du går"
 2020: "Högdalen Centrum"
 2020: "Sträck ut dina armar"
 2020: "Sträck ut dina armar (akustisk)
 2021: "Diamanter"

References

External links
 

Swedish songwriters
Swedish journalists
1972 births
Living people
Swedish-language singers
21st-century Swedish singers
21st-century Swedish male singers